The Kobo Emerging Writer Prize is a Canadian literary award, presented since 2015 by online e-book and audiobook retailer and eReader manufacturer Rakuten Kobo.

Awardees receive a $10,000 prize, and are provided with support in marketing their books. Three prizes are awarded each year, for literary fiction, non-fiction, and genre fiction. Each year, a different genre is honoured in the genre fiction category, rotating between mystery, romance and speculative fiction.

Winners

References

External links

Canadian fiction awards
Awards established in 2015
Canadian non-fiction literary awards